The Texas Rangers Major League Baseball team has played in Arlington, Texas, since 1972. The team began in 1961 as the Washington Senators, an American League expansion team based in Washington, D.C., before relocating to Texas. This list documents players and teams who hold records set in various statistical areas during single games, entire seasons, or their Rangers' careers.

Table key

Career records
These are records of players with the best performance in distinct statistical categories during their career with the Rangers.

Batting

Pitching

Single-season records
These are records of players with the best performance in distinct statistical categories during a single season.

Batting

Pitching

Single-game records
These are records of players and teams with the best performance in distinct statistical categories during a single game.

Batting

Pitching

Rare feats

Hitting for the cycle

Eleven Rangers have hit for the cycle in franchise history.

Triple plays

The Rangers have turned six triple plays in their franchise history.

See also
List of Texas Rangers no-hitters

Notes

References

records
Texas Rangers